Barbara F. Nowak  is a Polish-born Australian ichthyologist who specialises in sustainable aquaculture and aquatic animal health. As of 2021 she is Professor and Associate Dean Research Training at the University of Tasmania.

Nowak graduated from the University of Agriculture, Szczecin Poland with a MSc in 1982. She received a PhD in 1991 from the University of Sydney for her thesis, "Endosulfan residues in freshwater fish and effects of these residues on tissue structure".

Nowak was elected a Fellow of the Australian Society for Parasitology in 2018. In 2021 she was elected Fellow of the Australian Academy of Science.

References 

Living people
Year of birth missing (living people)
University of Sydney alumni
Academic staff of the University of Tasmania
Fellows of the Australian Academy of Science
Australian ichthyologists